Gymnastics at the 2021 Islamic Solidarity Games  was held in Konya, Turkey from 10 to 18 August 2022 in Konya Velodrome. Gymnastics competitions were held between 10–11 August 2022 for Men's Artistic and 17–18 August 2022 for Women's Artistic Gymnastics. Aerobic competitions were held between 13–14 August 2022 and The Rhytmic Gymnastics competitions were held on 13–14 August 2022.

The Games were originally scheduled to take place from 20 to 29 August 2021 in Konya, Turkey. In May 2020, the Islamic Solidarity Sports Federation (ISSF), who are responsible for the direction and control of the Islamic Solidarity Games, postponed the games as the 2020 Summer Olympics were postponed to July and August 2021, due to the global COVID-19 pandemic.

Medalists

Men's artistic

Women's artistic

Rhythmic

Aerobic

Medal table

Participating nations
A total of 113 athletes from 17 nations competed in gymnastics at the 2021 Islamic Solidarity Games:

Gallery

References

External links 
Official website
Results book – Aerobic Gymnastics
Results book – Artistic Gymnastics – Men
Results book – Artistic Gymnastics – Women
Results book – Rhythmic Gymnastics

2021 Islamic Solidarity Games
2021
Islamic Solidarity Games
International gymnastics competitions hosted by Turkey